Senator Gardner may refer to:

Members of the United States Senate
Cory Gardner (born 1974), U.S. Senator from Colorado since 2015
Obadiah Gardner (1852–1938), U.S. Senator from Maine from  1911 to 1913

United States state senate members
Abraham B. Gardner (1819–1881), Vermont State Senate
Augustus Peabody Gardner (1865–1918), Massachusetts State Senate
Berta Gardner (born 1954), Alaska State Senate
Bob Gardner (born c. 1954), Colorado State Senate
Booth Gardner (1936–2013), Washington State Senate
Elisha T. Gardner (1811–1879), Wisconsin State Senate
James N. Gardner (born 1946),  Oregon State Senate
John J. Gardner (1845–1921), New Jersey State Senate
Lucien D. Gardner (1876–1952), Alabama State Senate
Mills Gardner (1830–1910), Ohio State Senate
Oliver Max Gardner (1882–1947), North Carolina State Senate
Randy Gardner (politician) (born 1958), Ohio State Senate
Robert A. Gardner (politician), Ohio State Senate

See also
Senator Gardiner (disambiguation)